Sydney Sailboat (originally known as Bubble Bath Bay in Australia) is an Australian animated television series for children. It follows the adventures of Sydney the Sailboat and his fleet of friends who live in Bubble Bath Bay. The 11-minute episodes premiered on ABC Kids from 9 March 2015 with a second season screening in 2016. On 26 September 2016, it also aired in the United States on Sprout.

Characters

Main 

 Sydney Sailboat is the protagonist of the series. He is a plucky young male sailboat who dreams of one day sailing out through The Heads to explore the mysterious Big Blue Sea beyond the Harbour. Occasionally, he puts out his special coloured sail to go faster. He also has a front compartment where he keeps his set of tools which he uses in certain situations. His catchphrase is “Spinnaker, fly!” He is voiced by Samson Hyland.
 Zip is a feisty, young female trainee water taxi who is Sydney's best friend. She dreams of becoming the best water taxi in the whole harbor. Her catchphrase is “Hoop-dee-doo!” She is voiced by Frederique Sims.
 Terry is a strong male tugboat, who is the leader of the fleet, and keeps Bubble Bath Bay in order. His catchphrase is "Anchors aweigh!" Voiced by Colin Friels.

Supporting 

 Bryan is a male green boat, and one of two chatterbox ferries in the harbour. Voiced by Jack Simmons.
 Toots is a female red boat, and the other chatterbox ferry in the harbour. Voiced by Georgia Simmons.
 Muddles is an uneasy male crane boat. Voiced by Paul Tylak.
 Stormy is afemale red Petrel bird who oversees the activities of the boats. She also rings the bell to signal certain operations. Voiced by Emma Tate.
 Jet is a flamboyant young male speed boat. Voiced by Jack Simmons.
 Rodney is a swanky submarine who wears a monocle. Voiced by Adam Longworth.
 Cleo is a recklessly adventurous young female sailboat. Like Sydney, she is equipped with a special coloured sail to accelerate her movements. Voiced by Jacinda Papadopoulos.
 Queen Josephine is a mute giant ocean liner who passed through Bubble Bath Bay on two occasions.
 Min is a cute blue young male oar-powered boat who wears a sea monster's head on his bow. Voiced by Jack Simmons.
 Slick is a playful seal pup.

Episodes

Season 1 (2015)

Season 2

References

External links
Bubble Bath Bay at Essential Media

Australian Broadcasting Corporation original programming
2015 Australian television series debuts
2015 Australian television series endings
Australian children's animated television series
Australian preschool education television series
2010s Australian animated television series
Australian computer-animated television series
Nautical television series
Animated preschool education television series
2010s preschool education television series